Alexander Hartmann Bah (born 9 December 1997) is a Danish professional footballer who plays as a right-back for Primeira Liga club Benfica and the Denmark national team.

After coming through Næsby's youth academy, he was promoted to the first team in 2016, and later represented fellow Danish side HB Køge and spent two years with SønderjyskE in Danish Superliga. In January 2021, Bah joined Slavia Prague, where he won the Czech First League and Czech Cup in 2021 and was named the Czech First League's Defender of the Season in 2022, and then transferred to Benfica for €8 million.

After representing Denmark at various youth levels, Bah was called up to the full international team for the first time in November 2020. He scored on his international debut against Sweden, and went on to represent the side at the 2022 FIFA World Cup.

Early life
Bah was born in Årslev on the island of Funen, Denmark, and is of Gambian descent. He later attended efterskole education at ISI Idrætsefterskole in Ikast, where he also made appearances for local side Ikast FS.

Club career

Early career
Bah started his footballing career with local club Aarslev Boldklub, where he played for ten years before joining B 1913. He joined Næsby Boldklub three years later, in the spring of 2013, because the club according to Bah "[...] had a good reputation for developing young players". Furthermore, his youth coach Andreas Bech had also moved to Næsby Boldklub, which was also a significant factor in Bah's choice. After attending ISI Idrætsefterskole in Ikast in 2014–15, he returned to Næsby.

Næsby Boldklub
Bah made his breakthrough on the first team of Næsby Boldklub in the spring of 2016. He started on the bench in the first three games of the season, where he impressed as a substitute. He made his first start in the fourth matchday of the spring against Avarta on 2 April 2016, which Næsby won 4–0 at home at ALPI Arena Næsby, putting on a strong performance. He continued the season as a starter during the spring of 2016, where he made a total of six assists in 16 appearances in the third-tier Danish 2nd Division.

HB Køge
In August 2016, it was announced that Bah moved to HB Køge, where he signed a three-year contract. He made his debut for the club in the Danish Cup as part of the starting lineup, where he played the first 60 minutes before being replaced by Ahmed Hassan in a 0–2 win over Karlslunde IF in the 1st round. In November 2017, he was named "Talent of the Year", also known as the "Danske Bank Award", for HB Køge in 2017.

SønderjyskE
On 7 August 2018, Bah signed a five-year contract with Danish Superliga club SønderjyskE. He arrived at the club as a right winger, but largely played as a right wing-back with great success, which, among other things, have contributed to SønderjyskE winning a Danish Cup title and Bah making his full international debut for the Denmark national team. He was among the three nominated for Superliga Player of the Month in November 2020, but saw the award go to Jesper Lindstrøm of Brøndby IF.

Slavia Prague
On 5 January 2021, Bah signed for Czech First League club Slavia Prague on a four-and-a-half year contract. In doing so, SønderjyskE received a club record fee reported to be around DKK 13 million. He made his debut for the club as a starter on 16 January in a 3–1 win over Sigma Olomouc. Bah arrived at the club as a replacement for Vladimír Coufal, who left the for English Premier League side West Ham United, during the season, quickly became a starter in the right-back slot, after impressing his coach Jindřich Trpišovský for his defensive positioning and attacking play, helping his team win the domestic double of the Czech First League and Czech Cup.

The following season, Bah was named the Czech First League's Defender of the Season, making 26 appearances and scoring three goals as Slavia Prague finished runners-up behind Viktoria Plzeň, while also helping the club reached the quarter-finals of the inaugural UEFA Europa Conference League, where his team were eliminated, after losing 6–4 on aggregate to eventual finalists Feyenoord.

Benfica
On 7 June 2022, Bah signed a five-year contract with Primeira Liga side Benfica, for a reported fee of €8 million, joining former Slavia Prague teammate Petar Musa. He made his debut for the club on 5 August, replacing Gilberto in the 63rd minute and providing the assist for Rafa Silva's goal in a 4–0 home win over Arouca in the Primeira Liga.

International career
Bah represented Denmark at under-20 and under-21, for a total of 2 caps.

On 9 November 2020, he was called up to Kasper Hjulmand's senior squad for the friendly against Sweden due to several cancellations from, among others, the Danish national team players playing in England, due to the COVID-19 restrictions, as well as a case of COVID-19 in the squad, which had put several national team players in quarantine. He came on as a substitute at half-time during the match against Sweden and scored the final goal in a 2–0 win at Brøndby Stadium in his debut match, on 11 November 2020.

Style of play
Bah is mainly known for his speed, energy and offensive capabilities, as well as his technique, creativity and crossing ability. He is capable of playing as a full-back or winger on the right flank. He is an aggressive player who attacks spaces and seeks to break deep blocks with accurate passes, capable of receiving a pass from on the byline and finding the penalty spot with a pinpoint cross to allow his teammate to convert.

Career statistics

Club

International

Scores and results list Denmark's goal tally first, score column indicates score after each Bah goal.

Honours
SønderjyskE
Danish Cup: 2019–20 
Slavia Prague
Czech First League: 2020–21
Czech Cup: 2020–21
Individual
Danish 1st Division's Talent of the Year: 2017
Czech First League's Defender of the Season: 2022

References

External links

 Profile at the S.L. Benfica website

1997 births
Living people
Danish men's footballers
People from Faaborg-Midtfyn Municipality
Denmark international footballers
Danish people of Gambian descent
Danish Superliga players
Czech First League players
Primeira Liga players
Ikast FS players
FC Fyn players
Næsby Boldklub players
HB Køge players
SønderjyskE Fodbold players
SK Slavia Prague players
S.L. Benfica footballers
Association football midfielders
Danish 1st Division players
Danish 2nd Division players
Danish expatriate men's footballers
Expatriate footballers in the Czech Republic
Expatriate footballers in Portugal
Denmark youth international footballers
Denmark under-21 international footballers
Danish expatriate sportspeople in the Czech Republic
Danish expatriate sportspeople in Portugal
Sportspeople from the Region of Southern Denmark
2022 FIFA World Cup players